This is a list of medieval bestiaries. The bestiary form is commonly divided into "families," as proposed in 1928 by M. R. James and revised by Florence McCulloch in 1959–1962.

Latin bestiaries

First family 
The subfamily designated the "B-Is" version, dated to the 10th–13th centuries, are based upon the "B" version of the Physiologus and the writings of Isidore of Seville:e
 Cambridge, Corpus Christi College, MS 22
 London, British Library Royal MS 2.C.xii
 London, British Library Stowe MS 1067
 Los Angeles, Getty Museum Ludwig XV 3
 Los Angeles, Getty Museum Ludwig XV 4
 Oxford, Bodleian Library MS Bodley 602
 Oxford, Bodleian Library MS Douce 167
 Oxford, Bodleian Library MS Laud Misc. 247
 Paris, Bibliothèque Nationale Nouv. acq. lat. 873
 Vatican, Cod. Palat. lat. 1074

The "H" versions, late 13th-century, which in addition to a base Physiologus text, adds and arranges the content according to the "H" text or Book II of  De bestiis et aliis rebus of Hugues de Fouilloy (olim of Pseudo-Hugo de St. Victor).

 Cambridge, Sidney Sussex College 100
 Chalon-sur-Saône, Bibliothèque Municipale MS 14
 Paris, Bibliothèque Nationale lat. 2495A
 Paris, Bibliothèque Nationale lat. 2495B
 Paris, Bibliothèque Nationale lat. 3638A
 Paris, Bibliothèque Nationale lat. 14429
 Valenciennes, Bibliothèque Municipale MS 101

The "Transitional" group, appearing from the 12th to 14th century, incorporate material from other sources used by second family bestiaries:
 Northumberland Bestiary (Alnwick Castle, MS 447)
 Cambridge, Trinity College R.14.9
 Leningrad, Rossiiskaia natsional'naia biblioteka Q.v.V,1
 London, British Library Royal MS 2.B.vii
 London, British Library Royal MS 12.C.xix
 Munich, Bayerische Staatsbibliothek gall. 16
 New York, Morgan Library M. 81

Second family 

The works in this group are based principally on Isidore's Etymologiæ with significant additional material from Solinus, Saint Ambrose's Hexameron, Rabanus Maurus and others:
 Aberdeen Bestiary (Aberdeen University Library MS 24)
 Brussels, Bibliothèque Royale 8340
 Brussels, Bibliothèque Royale Hs 8827-42
 Cambridge, Corpus Christi College MS 53
 Cambridge, Fitzwilliam Museum MS 379 (C, W(B))
 Cambridge, Gonville and Caius College MS 109/178
 Cambridge, Gonville and Caius College MS 372/621
 Cambridge, Gonville and Caius College MS 384/604
 Cambridge, University Library Ii.4.26McCulloch|1960
 Canterbury, Cathedral Library Lit.D.10
 Chartres, Bibliothèque Municipale 63 (125)
 Copenhagen, Kongelige Bibliotek Gl. Kgl. 1633 4°
 Douai, Bibliothèque Municipale MS 711
 Le Mans, Bibliothèque Municipale 84
 London, British Library Add MS 11283
 London, British Library Harley MS 3244
 London, British Library Harley MS 4751
 Rochester Bestiary (London, British Library Royal MS 12.F.xiii)
 London, British Library Sloane MS 3544
 Los Angeles, Getty Museum, Salvatorberg Bestiary
 Nîmes, Bibliothèque Municipale 82
 New York, Morgan Library MS M. 890
 Oxford, Bodleian Library MS. Ashmole 1511
 Oxford, Bodleian Library MS. Bodley 533
 Oxford, Bodleian Library MS. Bodley 764
 Oxford, Bodleian Library MS. Douce 88 A
 Oxford, Bodleian Library MS. Douce 151
 Oxford, St. John's College MS. 61
 Oxford, St. John's College MS. 178
 Oxford, University College MS. 120
 Paris, Bibliothèque Nationale lat. 3630
 Paris, Bibliothèque Nationale lat. 11207
 Paris, Mazarine Library 742 (1115)
 Vatican, Apostolic Library Reg. 258

Third family 
These, from the 13th century, expand on the above with various races of humans, mythological creatures, and sometimes wonders of the world from Bernard Silvestris and others:
 Cambridge, Fitzwilliam Museum 254
 Cambridge, University Library MS Kk.4.25
 Oxford, Bodleian Library, MS. e Musaeo 136
 Oxford, Bodleian Library MS. Douce 88 E
 Westminster Abbey Library MS 22

Fourth family 
The sole work in this family, from the 15th century, is distinguished by its incorporation of writings by Bartholomaeus Anglicus:
 Cambridge, University Library MS. Gg.6.5

Dicta Chrysostomi 
These works were attributed in their time to John Chrysostom and appeared, mostly in Germany, from the 12th to 15th century:
 Bad Windsheim, Ratsbibl. Cod. 28
 Brussels, Bibliothèque Royale 18421-29
 Chicago, Newberry Library MS 31.1
 Epinal, Bibliothèque Municipale 58 (209)
 Göttweg, Stiftsbibl. Cod. Ms. 154
 Göttweg, Stiftsbibl. Cod. ms. 200
 Harvard University, Houghton Library MS Typ 101
 Leningrad, Gos. Publ. Biblioteka Saltykova-Shchedrina lat. Q.v.III,1
 Leipzig, Universitätsbibl. Paul. fol. 351
 Leipzig, Universitätsbibl. Paul. 4° 1305
 Linz, Studienbibl. Cod. ms. Cc.II.15
 London, British Library Sloane MS 278
 Munich, Bayerische Staatsbibliothek clm 536
 Munich, Bayerische Staatsbibliothek clm 2655
 Munich, Bayerische Staatsbibliothek clm 3221
 Munich, Bayerische Staatsbibliothek clm 5613
 Munich, Bayerische Staatsbibliothek clm 5921
 Munich, Bayerische Staatsbibliothek clm 6908
 Munich, Bayerische Staatsbibliothek clm 9600
 Munich, Bayerische Staatsbibliothek clm 14216
 Munich, Bayerische Staatsbibliothek clm 14348
 Munich, Bayerische Staatsbibliothek clm 14693
 Munich, Bayerische Staatsbibliothek clm 16189
 Munich, Bayerische Staatsbibliothek clm 19648
 Munich, Bayerische Staatsbibliothek clm 23787
 New York, Morgan Library MS M. 832
 Paris, Bibliothèque de l’Arsenal lat. 394
 Paris, Bibliothèque Nationale lat. 10448
 Uppsala, Universitetsbibliotek C 145
 Vienna, Osterreichische Nationalbibliothek 303
 Vienna, Osterreichische Nationalbibliothek 1010
 Vienna, Osterreichische Nationalbibliothek 2511
 Vienna, Osterreichische Nationalbibliothek 4609
 Vienna, Osterreichische Nationalbibliothek 13378
 Wolfenbüttel, Herzog August Bibliothek 35a Helmst. (Manuscript digitized)

Single Author manuscripts 

Many manuscripts contain portions of bestiaries that can be attributed to a single author. These include works by Isidore of Seville's Etymologiae, Thomas de Cantimpré's Liber de Natura Rerum, and Hugues de Fouilloy's De avibus

Hugues de Fouilloy
 Munich, Bayerische Staatsbibliothek, Clm 9649 (Hugues de Fouilloy, De avibus in a miscellany)

Isidore of Seville
 Philadelphia, University of Pennsylvania, Kislak Center for Special Collections, Rare Books and Manuscripts, LJS 184 (Isidore of Seville, Etymologiae)

Thomas de Cantimpré
 Philadelphia, University of Pennsylvania, Kislak Center for Special Collections, Rare Books and Manuscripts, LJS 23 (Thomas de Cantimpré, Liber de Natura Rerum)
 Brugge, Openbare Bibliotheek, Ms. 410 (XIII)
 Brugge, Openbare Bibliotheek, Ms. 411 (XV)
 Brugge, Openbare Bibliotheek, Ms. 412 (XIV)
 Brugge, Openbare Bibliotheek, Ms. 413 (XIV)
 Wrocław, Biblioteka Uniwersytecka, Ms. R 174 (XV)

French bestiaries 
The French bestiaries are all derived from works with commonly attributed authorship, and are divided as such:

Bestiaire in Verse by Philippe de Thaon 
 Copenhagen, Kongelige Bibliotek Gl. kgl. S. 3466 8º
 London, British Library Cotton MS Nero A.v
 Oxford, Merton College MS. 249

Bestiaire of Gervaise 
 London, British Library Add MS 28260

Bestiaire of Guillaume le Clerc 
 Cambridge, Fitzwilliam McLean 123
 Cambridge, Fitzwilliam Mus. J.20
 Cambridge, Trinity College O.2.14
 London, British Library Cotton Vespasian A.vii
 London, British Library Egerton MS 613
 London, British Library Royal MS 16.E.viii
 Lyon, Palais des Arts 78
 Oxford, Bodleian Library MS. Bodley 912
 Oxford, Bodleian Library MS. Douce 132
 Paris, Bibliothèque de l'Arsenal 2691
 Paris, Bibliothèque Nationale fr. 902
 Paris, Bibliothèque Nationale fr. 1444
 Paris, Bibliothèque Nationale fr. 2168
 Paris, Bibliothèque Nationale fr. 14964
 Paris, Bibliothèque Nationale fr. 14969
 Paris, Bibliothèque Nationale fr. 14970
 Paris, Bibliothèque Nationale fr. 20046
 Paris, Bibliothèque Nationale fr. 24428
 Paris, Bibliothèque Nationale fr. 25406
 Paris, Bibliothèque Nationale fr. 25408
 Paris, Bibliothèque Nationale Rothschild IV.2.24
 New Haven, Beinecke Library MS 395 (formerly Phillipps 4156)
 Vatican, Apostolic Library Regina 1682
 In a Psalter, the Queen Mary Psalter, British Library Royal MS 2B, vii
 In a psalter, the Isabelle Psalter, State Library, Munich

Bestiaire of Pierre de Beauvais 
 Malines, Bibliothèque du Séminaire 32
 Montpellier, Bibliothèque de la Faculté de Médecine H.437
 Paris, Bibliothèque de l'Arsenal fr. 3516
 Paris, Bibliothèque Nationale fr. 834
 Paris, Bibliothèque Nationale fr. 944
 Paris, Bibliothèque Nationale nouv. acq. 13251
 ex-Phillipps 6739 [C, M]
 Vatican, Apostolic Library Reg. 1323

Middle English bestiary 
 London, British Library Arundel MS 292

Italian bestiaries 
 Florence, Bibl. Laurenziana Cod. plut. LXXXX Inf. Cod. 47 (Bibl. Gadd.)
 Florence, Bibl. Laurenziana Cod. Ashb. 649
 Florence, Bibl. Naz. Cod. Magliabecchiano II.8.33
 Florence, Bibl. Naz. cl. XII Cod. Strozz. Magliabecchiano 135
 Florence, Biblioteca Ricardiana Cod. 1357 P.III.4
 Florence, Biblioteca Ricardiana Cod. 2183 R.IV 4 Nr. 2260
 Florence, Biblioteca Ricardiana Cod. 2281
 Naples, Bibl. Naz. XII.E.11
 Padova, Museo Civico di Padova (Bibl. Comun.) Cod. C.R.M.248
 Paris, Bibliothèque Nationale ital. 450
 Rome, Bibl. Corsini 44.G.27

Catalan bestiaries 
 Barcelona, Bibl. Universitària 75
 Barcelona, Bibl. de Catalunya 87
 Barcelona, Bibl. de Catalunya 310
 Vic, Bibl. Capitular 229
 Vic, Bibl. Capitular 1354

Icelandic bestiary 
 Copenhagen, Arnamagnæanske Institut, Arnamagnæanske Institut, AM 673a 4º

German bestiary 
 Munich, Bayerische Staatsbibliothek, Cgm 38 (Konrad von Megenberg, Das Buch der Natur)
 Munich, Bayerische Staatsbibliothek, Cgm 8414 (Konrad von Megenberg, Das Buch der Natur)

References

Bibliography

 Badke, David. "Bestiary Families." at The Medieval Bestiary

 

 ; [ Reprint], C. N. Potter, 1976

 

Bestiary